Barbara Leonard may refer to:
 Barbara Leonard (politician)
 Barbara Leonard (actress)
 Barbara Leonard Reynolds, née Leonard, American author